Kot Radha Kishan is a city and Tehsil headquarters of Kot Radha Kishan Tehsil in Kasur District in the Punjab province of Pakistan. The city is administratively subdivided into four Union councils. It was formerly part of Kasur Tehsil and now it has been rewarded with the status of tehsil of district kasur due to the basic necessities of the current time and the mounting population of the area .It is located at 31°10'21N 74°5'59E with an altitude of 193 metres. Kot Radha Kishan is also called 'City of Containers and Leather'.

Population
The population of Kot Radha Kishan is about 1,55,000 with an annual growth rate of 2.7%, household size 7.4 and literacy rate is about 69%. The population of the surrounding villages of Kot Radha Kishan is more than 1,62,000 with a literacy rate of about 53%. These surrounding villages are totally depending on Kot Radha Kishan in sense of Railway Station, Bus Stand, Post Office, Banks, Colleges, Girls High Schools, sub-division courts, crops and vegetable market and to buy the house hold items for their daily use.

Living

The educated people of Kot Radha Kishan as well as surrounding villagers are mostly dependent on government as well as private jobs. Illiterate people of the town work as workers in the nearby industrial zone of Raiwind as well as in Lahore. Others from villages depend on agriculture. Small numbers of people have power loom industries in their homes.

Prem Nagar Village, where a large railway dry port by the name of MICT is operational, is situated in between Raiwand and Kot Radha Kishan in the Punjab Province of Pakistan.

Education
In the public sector, there are three separate public high schools for boys and girls, including Govt. High School No. 1 for boys, Govt. High School Kot Sardar Muhammad Khan and a high school for girls. There is also a large number of private schools are running in the city. This shows the love and devotion of the local people toward education. A High School in near village Pemar Utar is serving the people for many decades. The students of this school won prizes at district as well as divisional level. There are three degree colleges, two for boys and the other one for girls. These colleges provide education for intermediate and degree levels. Recently, a modern library has been built in the degree college for girls. The Learning School is one of the best schools of Kasur district providing quality education on not for profit basis and children of surrounding 20 km area avails school transport system on subsidies rates.
Branches of various school chains like 'The Educators', 'Dar-e-Arqam are also spreading the light of education in the cityKot Radha Kishan is the smallest tehsil of Lahore Division but the 2nd highest literacy rate after Pattoki.

Murders of Shahzad Masih and Shama Bibi
On 4 November 2014, Christians Shahzad Masih and his pregnant wife Shama Bibi were attacked and then burned in a brick kiln in a village named Chak no. 59 situated near Kot Radha Kishan. The illiterate couple were accused of blasphemy after Bibi burned amulets which she did not know might have contained Qur'anic verses and were killed by a local mob. 59 people were indicted for the murder and on 23 November 2016, five people including a Muslim cleric were sentenced to death for the lynching and another eight jailed for two years each.

References

Kasur District